Andy McEntee is a Gaelic football manager. He has been the manager of the Antrim county team since 2022. He managed his native Meath between 2016 and 2022.

Career
McEntee managed Meath to the final of the 2012 All-Ireland Minor Football Championship. He led Ballyboden St Enda's of Dublin to the 2015–16 All-Ireland Senior Club Football Championship. He was named as Meath manager in August 2016.

In 2019, he led Meath back to Division 1 of the National Football League for the first time since 2006.

He led Meath to Leinster finals in 2018 and 2019.

He left after Meath exited the 2022 All-Ireland Senior Football Championship.

Then McEntee was unexpectedly appointed as Antrim county football team senior manager on a three-year term.

Personal life
His son Shane plays for Meath.

Andy McEntee is the younger brother of former Meath footballer, Gerry. Another brother, Shane, was a Fine Gael politician, who was a Teachta Dála (TD) from 2005 until his death in 2012. His daughter Helen succeeded him. Helen McEntee became her country's Minister for Justice in June 2020.

References

Living people
All-Ireland Senior Club Football Championship winning managers
Gaelic football managers
Andy
Year of birth missing (living people)